2003 ISAF Sailing World Championships was the first edition of the ISAF Sailing World Championships and was held in Cadiz, Spain from 11 September to 24 September.

Venue
The venue for the 2003 ISAF Sailing World Championships was Cádiz with three marinas: El Puerto de Santa María for Mistral, Finn, Yngling, Europe, Star, Tornado and 49er, Cádiz for Laser and Rota for 470. Racing was held on nine race areas off Cádiz.

Events and equipment
The following events were open for entries:

Summary

Medal table

Event medalists

Men and women events

470

Men

Women

Mistral

Men

Women

Open events

49er

Finn

Tornado

Men events

Laser

Star

Women events

Europe

Yngling

References

External links
Full results from site of International Sailing Federation

World championships
2003
Sailing competitions in Spain
International sports competitions hosted by Spain
2003 in Spanish sport